American Airlines Flight 102 was a flight operated by a McDonnell Douglas DC-10 from Honolulu International Airport to Dallas/Fort Worth International Airport. On landing, it was raining and there were numerous thunderstorms in the area. Shortly after touchdown on runway 17L, the pilot lost directional control as the aircraft began to weathervane, and it departed the right side of the runway. All 202 occupants on board survived, with two passengers suffering serious injuries during the emergency evacuation. The aircraft was badly damaged and was written off.

The National Transportation Safety Board concluded that the cause of the accident was the failure of the captain to use proper directional control technique during the landing roll.

Aircraft and crew

Aircraft 

The aircraft involved in the incident was a McDonnell Douglas DC-10-30 (registration N139AA) It was delivered to National Airlines in 1973 with the registration N80NA and was named Bing Crosby. After National Airlines was acquired by Pan Am, the aircraft was transferred to Pan Am in January 1980 and was named Clipper Star of the Union with the same registration. In February 1984, the aircraft was delivered to American Airlines and got the registration N139AA and had been operated continuously by the airline since, accumulating a total of 74,831 flight hours.

Flight crew 
The aircraft had a flight crew of three. The captain, 59-year-old Kenneth Kruslyak, had a total of 12,562 flight hours, 555 of which were in the DC-10. He was employed by American Airlines on August 1, 1966, and was designated as a captain in the DC-10 in November 1991. Kruslyak held an Airline Transport Pilot Certificate and was type rated in the DC-10, Boeing 727, and DC-9, with a commercial type rating in the Boeing 377. The first officer, 40-year-old David Harrell, had 4,454 flight hours with American Airlines, 554 of which were in the DC-10. The flight engineer, 60-year-old Francis Roggenbuck, held a current Flight Engineer certificate. He was employed by American Airlines in October 1955. Roggenbuck had a total of 20,000 flight hours, all of which were as a flight engineer, and 4,800 hours of which were in the DC-10.

Cabin crew and passengers 
The aircraft was carrying ten cabin crew and 189 passengers.

Crash 
As the aircraft landed, it began to weathervane and departed the right side of runway 17L. The aircraft dug into deep mud, collapsing the nose landing gear, and damaging the left engine and the left wing. A small fire was quickly extinguished by firefighters who arrived from a nearby airport fire station. The aircraft came to rest along an adjacent taxiway and was steeply tilted to one side, causing some evacuation slides to deploy improperly; during the ensuing emergency evacuation, two passengers fell from the slides, suffering serious injuries. Three crew and 35 passengers suffered minor injuries in the crash and emergency evacuation.

Investigation 

The National Transportation Safety Board concluded that the cause of the accident was:

Aftermath
N139AA was damaged beyond repair and was written off. American Airlines continues to use flight number 102 on the same route from Honolulu to Dallas using a Boeing 787.

See also 

 List of American Airlines accidents and incidents

References

Notes

Citations

1993 in Texas
1993 meteorology
Accidents and incidents involving the McDonnell Douglas DC-10
Airliner accidents and incidents caused by weather
Airliner accidents and incidents in Texas
102
Aviation accidents and incidents in 1993
Disasters in Texas
Airliner accidents and incidents involving runway overruns
Aviation accidents and incidents in the United States in 1993
April 1993 events in the United States